Jeremy Barnes may refer to:

Jeremy Barnes (baseball) (born 1987), American baseball coach
Jeremy Barnes (cricketer) (born 1970), English cricketer and clergyman
Jeremy Barnes (musician) (born 1976), American musician